Taiki may refer to:

People 
, Japanese footballer
, Japanese Paralympic alpine skier
, Japanese dancer and actor
, Japanese baseball player
, Japanese footballer
, Japanese footballer
, a diplomat of Chūzan Kingdom

Places 

Taiki, Hokkaidō, a town in Hokkaidō, Japan
Taiki, Mie, a town in Mie Prefecture, Japan

Others 

Taiki Kou, the Sailor Moon character.
Taiki Kudou (Mikey Kudo in English dub), the main character in Digimon Xros Wars
Taiki Asakura, a character in the manga Mad Love Chase by Kazusa Takashima
Mazda Taiki, a concept car 

Japanese masculine given names